Opercularia is a genus of freshwater, colonial, sessiline peritrich ciliates.  As consumers of free bacteria in the water, several species of Opercularia serve as important indicator organisms in the study of wastewater treatment.  Operculariids can be distinguished from other sessile peritrichs (many of which share very similar body plans) by their prominent, non-contractile stalk; peristome without lip; and elongate, horseshoe-shaped macronucleus.

Etymology
The name Opercularia comes from the Latin opercularis, which means covered (with a lid). This is in reference to their lid-like peristomal disk.

Selected species
Selected species include:
Opercularia allensi 
Opercularia coarctata 
Opercularia cylindrata 
Opercularia longigula 
Opercularia minima 
Opercularia nutans 
Opercularia stenostoma

References

Oligohymenophorea